The Wells Fargo History Museum is a museum operated by Wells Fargo in its corporate headquarters in San Francisco, California that features exhibits about the History of Wells Fargo. It includes original stagecoaches, photographs, gold nuggets and mining artifacts, the Pony Express, telegraphs and historic bank artifacts. The museum was initially known as the Wells Fargo History Room when it opened in 1927 in San Francisco. In 1935, a museum was opened for public tours.

Until 2020, when eleven of the museums were closed by Wells Fargo, the company operated twelve museums in various cities in the United States. In 2020, Wells Fargo announced the closure of all but one of its museums. The Wells Fargo History Museum in its corporate headquarters of San Francisco, California was the only museum to remain open.

Closed museum locations 
 Financial Center in downtown Des Moines, Iowa
 Three Wells Fargo Center in Charlotte, North Carolina
 Wells Fargo Center in downtown Los Angeles, California
 Wells Fargo Center in Minneapolis, Minnesota
 Wells Fargo Building in Philadelphia, Pennsylvania
 Wells Fargo Museum (Phoenix) at Wells Fargo Plaza in Phoenix, Arizona
 Wells Fargo Center in Portland, Oregon
 Wells Fargo Center in Sacramento, California
 Alaska Heritage Museum in Anchorage, Alaska, which featured a large collection of Alaskan Native artifacts, ivory carvings and baskets, fine art by Alaskan artists, and displays about Wells Fargo history in the Alaskan Gold Rush era.
 Wells Fargo History Museum in the Pony Express Terminal in Old Sacramento State Historic Park, which was the company's second office
 Wells Fargo History Museum in Old Town San Diego State Historic Park

References

External links

 Wells Fargo History Museum

Museums in Charlotte, North Carolina
Museums in Los Angeles
Museums in Minneapolis
Museums in Philadelphia
Museums in Phoenix, Arizona
Museums in Portland, Oregon
Museums in Sacramento, California
Museums in San Francisco
Museums in San Diego
Wells Fargo
American West museums
Museums in Des Moines, Iowa